The Libertarian Party of Indiana is the Indiana affiliate of the Libertarian Party.

History and operations
The founding meeting of the Libertarian Party of Indiana was held on July 14, 1974, at the Holiday Inn at Weir Cook Airport (now called the Indianapolis International Airport). Approximately 20–25 people attended including Paul Hyatt, Tom Duncan, Marvin Lazaro, Brian Bernstein, Dick Smith, Steve Butterbaugh, and Charlie Reisert. Reisert made the motion to start the Libertarian Party of Indiana. The first headquarters was located at 1430 N. Capitol Avenue in Indianapolis. The LPIN became a minor political party in 1994 after achieving ballot access when Steve Dillon received more than 2% of the vote running for Secretary of State.

In 2008, the Libertarian presidential ticket of Bob Barr and Wayne Allyn Root had their strongest showing in Indiana, receiving 1.1% of the vote (19,243 votes). The party's best finish in a statewide race came in 2006 when US Senate candidate Steve Osborn received about 13% of the vote. Osborn had the best result for a third-party candidate running for the Senate in the 2006 elections.

Officials and staff

State Central Committee

National Committee Representative

Current elected officeholders
, there are eight Libertarian members who hold elected office in Indiana.

 Susan Bell – Town Judge, Hagerstown
 Cheryl Heacox – Advisory Board, Clay Township
 Larry Walters – Town Council, Dublin
 Jessica Wallace – Town Council, at large, Larwill
 Renee Sweeney – Town Council, Ossian
 Jamie Jo Owens – Trustee, Liberty Township
 Terry Coffman – Advisory Board, Liberty Township
 Dean Hartley – Advisory Board, Franklin Township
 Ryan Coby – Town Council, Milton
 Nathan Kring – County Council, Tipton County
 Patricia Warner – Clerk-Treasurer, Claypool
 Matthew Kennedy – City Council, New Haven

Appointed officeholders
Several Libertarians have been appointed to offices in Indiana:
 Mark W. Rutherford – Chairman, Indiana Public Defender Commission (Since 2007)
 Scott Baker – Elkhart County Innkeepers Tax Commission (Since 2006)
 Joyce Morrell – Rush County Fiber Optic Board (Since 2016)
 Tom Monka – Rush County Planning Commission (Since 2016)
 Michael Dowden – Town of Brownsburg Economic Development Commission (2017–2020); Town of Brownsburg Improvement Committee (2017); Town of Brownsburg Redevelopment Authority (2014–2016)
 Paul Morrell – Chairman, Rush County Sheriff's Officer Merit Board (Since 2017)
 Jeffrey Mauer – Carmel Economic Development Commission (Since 2020); Home Place Advisory Board (Since 2018)
 Anna Elliott – Martinsville Board of Zoning Appeals, Vice-chair (Since 2019)
 Shane Lemler – Vincennes Urban Enterprise Association Board (Since 2020)
 Joel Samuelson – Culver Planning Commission (Since 2020)
 Joseph Bachman – New Chicago Planning Commission (Since 2020); New Chicago Parks Board (Since 2020)
 Jennifer Meador – Mooresville Board of Zoning Appeals (Since 2021)
 Ryan Patterson – Secretary, Franklin County Economic Development Commission (Since 2021)

Past state chairs

Past candidates 
 Donald Rainwater was the 2020 LPIN nominee for Governor for Indiana. He lost to incumbent Governor Eric Holcomb, but he made a huge impact in the election having received 11.4% (345,567 votes) of the vote after polling as high as 25%. His success has invigorated the Libertarian Party of Indiana, especially in the light of his 2nd-place finish in 1/3 of the 92 counties. Their motto in the 2021 convention, "Level Up" has inspired them to make serious moves to be a party of contention in Indiana politics.
 Steve Osborn is an American politician. He was the 2006 Libertarian Party nominee for US Senate from Indiana. He lost to incumbent Republican Senator Dick Lugar in the 2006 United States Senate election in Indiana. He was Lugar's only opponent on the ballot in that election, as the Democratic Party did not field a candidate. Osborn received about 13% of the vote, the best result for a Libertarian in the 2006 U.S. national-level elections. His previous political experience includes attempted bids for the Democratic nomination for U.S. Representative in his home district in 2000 and 2002. Steve Osborn is from La Porte, Indiana.
 Paul Hager ran for the U.S. Representative in Indiana's 8th district in 1994, 1996, and 1998. Also, he ran for US Senate in 2000. In 2002, he ran for Indiana Secretary of State on the issue of voting reform.

Awards
Awards are presented at the LPIN Convention each year. With the exception of one award, all winners are granted their award by a vote of the LPIN membership.

Dr. Barbara Bourland Light of Liberty Award
 The recipient is honored as the person most responsible for the growth of the party and dedication to the libertarian cause.

Susan Bell Officeholder of the Year Award
 Awarded to a current elected officeholder of the Libertarian Party that best promotes libertarian principles and values through public service.

Ken Bisson Outreach Award
 Awarded to a party member who has striven to spread the message of libertarian principles to as many potential voters as is possible.

Joe Hauptmann Campaign Leadership Award
 Awarded to a campaign volunteer who has worked above and beyond in an extraordinary fashion, and has significantly contributed to the success of a campaign.

Phil Miller Candidate of the Year
 Awarded to a Libertarian Candidate that has shown an extraordinary ability to reach and connect with voters, as well as further the cause of libertarianism.

Steve Dasbach Chairman's Award for Extraordinary Service
 Awarded to an individual that has helped grow the Libertarian Party of Indiana in extraordinary ways over many years. This award is not voted on by LPIN membership, and it is the sole privilege of the Chair of the LPIN to award it to the recipient.

Bill Bean County Affiliate of the Year Award
 In recognition of an outstanding county affiliate for their electoral success, fundraising and membership contribution to the LPIN, and contribution to LPIN ballot access.

References

External links

 Libertarian Party of Indiana homepage
 Libertarian Party of Indiana – LPedia

Politics of Indiana
Political parties in Indiana
Indiana
1974 establishments in Indiana